Yang Siping (born 14 February 1995) is a Chinese footballer currently playing as a midfielder for Jiangxi Beidamen.

Career statistics

Club
.

Notes

References

1995 births
Living people
Chinese footballers
Association football midfielders
China League Two players
China League One players
Shanghai JuJu Sports F.C. players
Yunnan Flying Tigers F.C. players
Lhasa Urban Construction Investment F.C. players
Jiangxi Beidamen F.C. players